Carl Foerster & Sons was a Milwaukee maker of bandoneóns, concertinas, accordions, reed organs, and roller organs. Founded by German migrants, it was active from at least 1909 through at least the 1920s.

References

1909 establishments in Wisconsin
American musical instrument makers
Musical instrument manufacturing companies of the United States